The De Gasperi II Cabinet was the first cabinet of the Italian Republic. It was established by Alcide De Gasperi following the referendum of 2 June 1946, in which the Italian people voted in favour of the Republic. It held office from 13 July 1946 until 2 February 1947, a total of 203 days, or 6 months and 18 days.

Government parties
The government was composed by the following parties:

Party breakdown

Beginning of term
 Christian Democracy (DC): Prime minister, 7 ministers, 10 undersecretaries
 Italian Socialist Party of Proletarian Unity (PSIUP): 4 ministers, 5 undersecretaries
 Italian Communist Party (PCI): 3 ministers, 5 undersecretaries
 Italian Republican Party (PRI): 2 ministers, 3 undersecretaries 
 Italian Liberal Party (PLI): 1 minister

End of term
 Christian Democracy (DC): Prime minister, 8 ministers, 9 undersecretaries
 Italian Socialist Party of Proletarian Unity (PSIUP): 4 ministers, 6 undersecretaries
 Italian Communist Party (PCI): 3 ministers, 5 undersecretaries
 Italian Republican Party (PRI): 2 ministers, 3 undersecretaries

Composition

References

Italian governments
1946 establishments in Italy
1947 disestablishments in Italy
Cabinets established in 1946
Cabinets disestablished in 1947
De Gasperi 2 Cabinet